Filippo De Filippi (1869–1938) was an Italian medical doctor, scientist, mountaineer and explorer. De Filippi was born in Turin on 6 April 1869 to Giuseppe De Filippi, a lawyer, and Olimpia Sella.

Personal and professional life
Working as a doctor De Filippi specialised in physiological chemistry and in experimental aspects of surgery, lecturing at Bologna and Genoa universities.

De Filippi married the poet Caroline Fitzgerald in 1901, daughter of William John Fitzgerald. In World War I he volunteered as a lieutenant colonel in the Red Cross and was posted to London from 1917 to 1919 where he ran the Italian office of propaganda and information. He was awarded the honorary knighthood of KCIE in 1916.

He was the editor of the travel and exploration section of the Enciclopedia italiana. He died at Settignano near Florence on 23 September 1938.

Expeditions
Well known as an Alpine mountaineer, in 1897 De Filippi joined the Duke of the Abruzzi in an expedition to Alaska where they were the first people to climb Mount Saint Elias on 31 July. Then, in 1903, he explored Asia, crossing the Caucasus and entering Turkestan. In 1906 he wrote the book about (though did not take part in)  Abruzzi's exploration of the Ruwenzori mountains on the Uganda–Congo border. In 1909 he again went with the Duke of the Abruzzi, this time in the Karakoram mountains, writing the book describing the expedition.

From 1913 to 1914, De Filippi organised and led a large and highly successful scientific expedition to Central Asia: Baltistan, Ladakh and Xinjiang. Accurate gravity and magnetic measurements were made and wireless signals were used to determine longitude. There were ethnological and anthropological, topographical and geological studies. The exploration determined that the Rimo Glacier formed the watershed of Central Asia. The work was written up in seventeen volumes.

Publications

 – travels of Ippolito Desideri

References

Further reading

1869 births
1938 deaths
19th-century explorers
20th-century explorers
Explorers of the Himalayas
Explorers of the Caucasus
Explorers of Central Asia
Italian explorers
Academic staff of the University of Bologna
Academic staff of the University of Genoa
Honorary Knights Commander of the Order of the Indian Empire